Parapercis decemfasciata is a fish species in the sandperch family, Pinguipedidae. It is found in southern Japan, South Korea and Taiwan in the Pacific Ocean. 
This species can reach a length of  TL.

References

Masuda, H., K. Amaoka, C. Araga, T. Uyeno and T. Yoshino, 1984. The fishes of the Japanese Archipelago. Vol. 1. Tokai University Press, Tokyo, Japan. 437 p.

Pinguipedidae
Taxa named by Victor Franz
Fish described in 1910